The African Cup of Champions Clubs 1976 was the 12th edition of the annual international club football competition held in the CAF region (Africa), the African Cup of Champions Clubs. It determined that year's club champion of association football in Africa.

The tournament was played by 25 teams and used a knock-out format with ties played home and away. MC Alger of Algeria won the final, becoming CAF club champion for the first time, and the first club from Algeria to win the trophy.

First round

|}
1

Second round

|}
1

Quarter-finals

|}

Semi-finals

|}

Final

Champion

Top scorers
The top scorers from the 1976 African Cup of Champions Clubs are as follows:

External links
African Cup of Champions results at Rec.Sport.Soccer Statistics Foundation

1
African Cup of Champions Clubs